Elysius carbonarius is a moth of the family Erebidae. It was described by Paul Dognin in 1891. It is found in Bolivia and Peru.

References

carbonarius
Moths described in 1891
Moths of South America